Charles Norman Currey (26 February 1916 – 10 May 2010) was a British sailor who won a silver medal in Finn class at the 1952 Olympics.

Currey was born into a marine family. He had to abandon an anticipated career in the British Navy due to an illness, and instead became a renowned sailor and boat builder. At the onset of World War II he was accepted as a member of Royal Naval Reserve, and was eventually promoted to lieutenant commander and appointed as captain of a gunboat patrolling the English Channel. He then returned to boat building and became an expert in the Firefly dinghy. He was considered for the 1948 Olympic team in this boat class, and was selected in 1952, when he won a silver medal ahead the Swedish boat designer Rickard Sarby. After that Currey designed and sailed other types of dinghies, as well as powerboats. In the 1960 he was appointed as managing director of the Fairey Marine company, where he worked for the past decades. His son Alistair Currey also became an Olympic sailor.

References

External links
 

1916 births
2010 deaths
British male sailors (sport)
Olympic sailors of Great Britain
Olympic silver medallists for Great Britain
Olympic medalists in sailing
Sailors at the 1952 Summer Olympics – Finn
Medalists at the 1952 Summer Olympics
Royal Naval Volunteer Reserve personnel of World War II
Royal Navy officers of World War II
Royal Naval Reserve personnel
Place of birth missing